Stagmatophora diakonoffi is a moth in the  family Cosmopterigidae. It is found in Madagascar.

References

Natural History Museum Lepidoptera generic names catalog

Cosmopteriginae
Moths of Africa
Moths described in 1968